Nebria vuillefroyi is a species of ground beetle in the Nebriinae subfamily that is endemic to Spain.

References

External links
Nebria vuillefroyi at Carabidae of the World

vuillefroyi
Beetles described in 1866
Beetles of Europe
Endemic fauna of Spain